Ehrenberg Island is a minor island in the Bastian Islands in the Svalbard archipelago. It lies north of Lange Island.

The wildlife consists largely of polar bears.

Most of the Bastian Islands were named during the First German North Polar Expedition in 1868. Ehrenberg Island is named after the German zoologist Christian Gottfried Ehrenberg.

References

Islands of Svalbard